Filip Meirhaeghe (born 5 March 1971 in Ghent) is a retired Belgian racing cyclist. His primary focus was in mountain bike racing, however, he has also taken part in elite road, cyclo-cross and track cycling.  He has won four Mountain Bike World Championships medals, one Olympic medal and a total of eleven mountain bike World Cup events. In the final years of his racing career he raced for the bicycle manufacturer Specialized Bicycle Components on the mountain bike and for the professional team Domina Vacanze-Elitron on the road.

Doping 
On 29 July 2004, just before the Athens 2004 Summer Olympics, Meirhaeghe admitted to having used EPO.  He tested positive during the World Cup in Mont Sainte-Anne, Quebec (Canada) and unlike most racers did not argue the validity of the test.  During a press conference he admitted he used EPO simply because of his desire to win gold at the Olympics.  He also announced at that time he would stop racing and retire.  He wrote a book called Positief, which tells the story of his life as an athlete and the consequences of his positive test. (issued by Davidsfonds – in Dutch only).

End of retirement 
Filip was suspended from professional racing until 14 January 2006 based on his positive test result. On 1 January 2006, he announced he would resume racing. He signed a three-year contract to race for Landbouwkrediet-Colnago on the road and Versluys-Landbouwkrediet-Sportstech on mountain bikes. He made his comeback during the beach-race of Oostduinkerke (Belgium).  He retired again in September 2009.

Major racing achievements 
 2000 Summer Olympics
 Silver: 2000 – Sydney (AUS)
 Mountain Bike World Championships
 Gold: 2003 – Lugano (SUI)
 Silver: 2002 – Kaprun (AUT)
 Bronze: 1998 – Mont Sainte-Anne (CAN)
 Bronze: 1999 – Åre (SWE)
 Mountain Bike World Cup
 Winner: 2002
 European XC MTB Championships
 Champion: 2000
 Belgian XC MTB Championships
 Champion: 1996, 1998, 2000, 2001
 Belgian Downhill National Championships
 Champion 1994
 Paris–Roubaix mountain bike
 Winner: 1997, 2002

See also
 List of doping cases in cycling
 List of sportspeople sanctioned for doping offences

References

External links 
 
 
 
 

1971 births
Living people
Belgian male cyclists
Cross-country mountain bikers
Olympic cyclists of Belgium
Olympic silver medalists for Belgium
Cyclists at the 2000 Summer Olympics
Cyclists at the 2008 Summer Olympics
Sportspeople from Ghent
Cyclists from East Flanders
Doping cases in cycling
Olympic medalists in cycling
UCI Mountain Bike World Champions (men)
Medalists at the 2000 Summer Olympics